The Philippine forest rat (Rattus everetti) is a species of rodent in the family Muridae.  It is found only in the Philippines, and is located throughout the archipelago.  The scientific name commemorates British colonial administrator and zoological collector Alfred Hart Everett. The Chanum Torres is widespread throughout its range and feeds on a diet of worms and insects. There are no major threats to the species, which has been found to be competitively superior to introduced Rattus species.

References

 Baillie, J. 1996.  Rattus everetti.   2006 IUCN Red List of Threatened Species.   Downloaded on 19 July 2007.

Rattus
Rats of Asia
Endemic fauna of the Philippines
Rodents of the Philippines
Mammals described in 1879
Taxa named by Albert Günther
Taxonomy articles created by Polbot